Ranggen is a municipality in the district of Innsbruck-Land in the Austrian state of Tyrol located 12 km west of Innsbruck. The location was mentioned as “Fergen” in 1482 for the first time. Ranggen has 17 parts.

Population

Geography 
Ranggen is situated in a hollow of the Inn valley terrace, west of Innsbruck or in the eastern continuation of the Inzinger mountain. The actual Ranggen village area is divided into an outer, upper and lower village. In addition, there are alley-like condensations and hamlets that characterize the image of the cultural landscape. A special feature of the settlement geography is the Ferklehen manor (located on the valley floor near Unterperfuss), whose name is derived from "Fergen", which originally meant the right to look after the Inn ferry at Zirl. After the construction of the Inn bridge (1482), the Fergen right then referred to bridge maintenance. The Rettenbach flows through Ranggen. The highest mountain is the Rangger Köpfl with 1939 m.

History 
In the Middle Ages and early modern times, the Premonstratensian monastery of Wilten (Innsbruck) had significant possessions in Ranggen. It kept its own archive drawer for this under the designation "Lutzlranggen" (from Middle High German lützel, lützelig = small, little), which is linguistically depicted today in the local place of Itzlranggen.

References

External links

Cities and towns in Innsbruck-Land District